Vikram is an Indian actor who works prominently in Tamil film industry. After making his cinematic debut in the 1990 film En Kadhal Kanmani, he acted in a series of small-budget Tamil, Telugu and Malayalam films. It was Bala's tragedy film Sethu (1999) that established Vikram in the Tamil film industry. In the early 2000s Vikram appeared in a series of masala films—Dhill, Gemini, Dhool and  Saamy all becoming commercially successful. During this period, Vikram performed diverse roles and received critical acclaim for his performances in Kasi and Samurai. In 2003, Vikram's performance as an autistic gravedigger in Pithamagan won a lot of acclaim and secured his first National Film Award for Best Actor. His portrayal as an innocent man with dissociative identity disorder in Shankar's Anniyan was commercially successful. Vikram's portrayal as a tribal leader in Mani Ratnam's Raavanan saw him secure further acclaim. The last three films also won him three Filmfare Awards for Best Actor – Tamil. He is only the third actor to receive a National Film Award for Best Actor in the Tamil film industry.

Vikram is known for his intense performances, with his work often fetching critical acclaim and commercial success. He has won a National Film Award and seven Filmfare Awards South, of which five are Best Actor awards.Three state awards for best actor.

Award Categories

Asianet Film Awards
The Asianet Film Awards are presented annually by Asianet, a television network based in Kerala.

CineMAA Awards
The CineMAA Awards are presented annually by Movie Artists Association Group, a television network based in Hyderabad.

Amrita TV-FEFKA Film Awards
The Amrita TV-FEFKA Film Awards are presented by Amrita TV along with FEFKA to honor artistic excellence in Malayalam and Tamil films.

Cinema Express Awards
The Cinema Express Awards are presented by the Indian Express Group to honour artistic excellence of professionals in the south Indian film industry which comprises Tamil, Telugu, Kannada and Malayalam film industries.

Filmfare Awards South
The Filmfare Awards South is given by the Filmfare Magazine as part of its annual Filmfare Awards. The awards are presented separately for the Tamil, Telugu, Kannada and Malayalam films.

Honorary Doctorate

International Tamil Film Awards
The International Tamil Film Awards (ITFA) is an award ceremony that honours artistic excellence in Tamil films. The awards were first presented in 2003.

Jaya Awards
The Jaya Awards have been presented by the Tamil television channel Jaya TV since 2011 to honour excellence in Tamil cinema.

Edison Awards
The Edison Awards have been presented by the Tamil television channel MyTamilMovie.com since 2009 to honour excellence in Tamil cinema.

National Film Awards
The National Film Award for Best Actor is a part of the National Film Awards presented annually to an actor who has delivered the best performance in a leading role within the Indian film industry.

South Indian International Movie Awards

Star Screen Awards

Tamil Nadu State Film Awards
The Tamil Nadu State Film Awards are presented annually by the Government of Tamil Nadu.

Vijay Awards
The Vijay Awards have been presented by the Tamil television channel STAR Vijay since 2006 to honour excellence in Tamil cinema.

Vikatan Award
Ananda Vikatan, one of the leading weeklies of Tamil Nadu has been awarding the films, actors and technicians on various criteria.

References

Lists of awards received by Indian actor